Garat may refer to

Places
Garat, Charente
Garat, the Hungarian name for Dacia village, Jibert Commune, Braşov County, Romania

People
 Anne-Marie Garat (born 1946), French novelist
 Dominique Garat (1735-1799), called the Old, French Basque politician, brother of Dominique-Joseph
 Dominique-Joseph Garat (1749–1833), French Basque politician, member of the Académie française
 Joseph Garat (1872–1944), French politician of the inter-war period (1918–1939)
 Pierre Garat (singer) (1762–1823), French "chanteur lyrique"; nephew of Dominique-Joseph Garat
 Pierre Garat (civil servant), head of the section for the Jewish question for the Gironde prefecture under the German occupation

Fictional characters
 Garat, character in the webcomic Anima: Age of the Robots